Giuseppe Rusnati (1650, Gallarate, Lombardy - 1713) was a Lombard sculptor of the Rococo period. Known for having trained with Ercole Ferrata and subsequently from 1673 to c. 1686 training a young Camillo Rusconi, prior to the latter's relocation himself to Ferrata's studio in Rome. Born near Como; he died in 1713. He worked for many years for the Duomo of Milan, where he worked along with Giuseppe Buono (1670–1709/21) and Carlo Simonetta (d 1693).

He also contributed to the Certosa di Pavia and sent many sculptures for the Sacri Monti of Piedmont and Lombardy, including to Monte Calvario; to the 9th, 10th, and 15th chapels of the Sacri Monti of Domodossola; to the 13th and 19th chapels of the Sacri Monti of Orta; and the statues of SS Domenico and Francisco in the high altar (1660–1662) for the Sacri Monti of Varese .

The facade of Santa Maria dell Passione (seen at right) in Milan is attributed to Rusnati.

References

Sacro Monte of Orta.

1650 births
1713 deaths
People from Gallarate
17th-century Italian sculptors
Italian male sculptors
18th-century Italian sculptors
Italian Baroque sculptors
Rococo sculptors
Sculptors from Lombardy
18th-century Italian male artists